Transit authority is a term used by the NSA to describe the agency's legal authority to collect all communications that transit the United States without a warrant, provided that both endpoints are foreign. The agency gained this power from Executive Order 12333.

References

National Security Agency
Mass surveillance